Crimson Tears is a cel-shaded 2004 sci-fi beat 'em up game developed by DreamFactory and co-produced by Capcom and Spike for the PlayStation 2.

Plot
The game is set in Tokyo in the year 2049 and revolves around three characters whose home has been destroyed. As seen on the game's front cover, this trio seems human; however, they are actually bio-engineered weapons developed by a company named A.R.M.A. called "mutanoids".

Gameplay
The game plays similarly to many dungeon crawlers except that the combat is in real-time. Unlike in most sixth generation games, the levels are completely flat. A notable feature of Crimson Tears is that the levels are generated on the fly using templates, as opposed to a predefined game worlds that are the same every time.

Reception

The game received "mixed" reviews according to video game review aggregator Metacritic. While critics praised the game's cel-shaded graphics and anime cutscenes, they criticized the game's repetitive nature.

Notes

References

External links
official page
Spike page

2004 video games
Capcom beat 'em ups
Video games with cel-shaded animation
PlayStation 2-only games
Science fiction video games
Video games featuring female protagonists
PlayStation 2 games
DreamFactory games
Spike (company) games
Video games developed in Japan